The Canadian Arctic Expedition 1913–1916 was a scientific expedition in the Arctic Circle organized and led by Vilhjalmur Stefansson.  The expedition was originally to be sponsored by the (US) National Geographic Society and the American Museum of Natural History. Canada took over the sponsorship because of the potential for discovery of new land and Stefansson, who though born in Canada was now an American, re-established his Canadian citizenship. The expedition was divided into a Northern Party led by Stefansson, and a Southern Party led by R M. Anderson.

Northern Party
The objective of the Northern Party was to explore for new land north and west of the known lands of the Canadian Arctic. At this time the possible existence of large undiscovered land masses, comparable to the Canadian Arctic islands or even a small continent, was scientifically plausible. The approach of the Northern Party, besides simply going out and looking for land, was a program of through-ice depth soundings to map the edge of the continental shelf. Meteorological, magnetic, and marine biological investigations were also planned.

Southern Party
Copper deposits and trade routes were of particular interest.

Results

1913 was a particularly bad year for Arctic navigation. All of the expedition ships were frozen in before they could reach their initial destination of Herschel Island. The principal ship of the expedition, the Karluk, was carried off and eventually crushed by the ice, leading to the loss of eleven lives before a famous rescue. Most of the Southern Party had travelled in other ships of the expedition, and Stefansson left the Karluk with a party of five before the ship was carried off. Stefansson promptly purchased a small schooner, the North Star, reconstituted the Northern Party with local hires and resumed exploring. Only one of the fourteen Karluk survivors rejoined the expedition. The expedition purchased another ship, the Polar Bear, in 1915. The Southern Party remained in the North through the summer of 1916, exploring and mapping as far east as Bathurst Inlet. Some members of the Northern Party continued exploring through 1918. The expedition discovered land previously unknown even to the Inuit  (including Brock, Mackenzie King, Borden, Meighen, and Lougheed Islands), produced valuable data, and launched the careers of several explorers and scientists. The controversies it engendered persisted for decades.

See also

 Diamond Jenness
 Robert Bartlett (explorer)
 Hubert Wilkins
 Christian Theodore Pedersen
 Voyage of the Karluk
 Ernest de Koven Leffingwell

References

Sources
 
 Bovet, John A. (1979) Archivaria 9 pp. 254–255 [Review of] Stefansson and the Canadian Arctic 
 Diubaldo, Richard J. Stefansson and the Canadian Arctic McGill-Queen's Press – MQUP, 1998 
 Gray, David. The People of the CAE. Northern Party with a contribution from Jette Elsebeth Ashlee. Canadian Museum of Civilization
 Gray, David. Canada's little arctic navy. The ships of the CAE. Canadian Museum of Civilization
 Gray, David. New Lands: explorations of the Northern Party Canadian Museum of Civilization
 Gray, David. New knowledge: Science and the Southern Party. Canadian Museum of Civilization
 Jenness, Stuart Edward. The Making of an Explorer: George Hubert Wilkins and the Canadian Arctic Expedition, 1913–1916. McGill-Queen's Press – MQUP, 2004. accessed April 26, 2009.
 
 New York Times September 18, 1915 Stefansson's quest to test a theory
 Stefansson, Vilhjalmur (1921) The friendly Arctic; the story of five years in polar regions. Macmillan, New York

Further reading
 Stuart Jenness (ed) (1991). Arctic Odyssey: Diary of Diamond Jenness, 1913–1916 
 Hunt, William R. (1986). Stef: A Biography of Vilhjalmur Stefansson, Canadian Arctic Explorer University of British Columbia Press. .
 Levere, Trevor H. (2004). Science and the Canadian Arctic: A Century of Exploration, 1818–1918 Cambridge University Press. .
 Montgomery, Richard. Pechuck. Kessinger Publishing, 2005 (originally published by Dodd Mead 1932) 
 
 
 Harold Noice (1924). With Stefansson in the Arctic; Dodd, Mead & Co., New York, 
 Gisli Palsson "The legacy of Vilhjalmur Stefansson"
 F. A. McDiarmid "Geographical Determinations of the Canadian Arctic Expedition" The Geographical Journal Vol. 62, No. 4 (Oct., 1923), pp. 293–302

External links
 Northern people, northern knowledge. The story of the Canadian Arctic Expedition 1913–1918  An extensive and detailed online exhibit from the Canadian Museum of Civilization. Particularly strong on the roles of local Inuit, and other Arctic residents hired for the expedition. Specific sections of this website are cited above as references attributed to David Gray, the principal researcher and writer of the exhibit.
 Anne Mease Explorers and Northern Exploration Northern Research Portal, University of Saskatchewan. A multi-part article including a section on Stefansson.
 Karsten Andersen Manuscripts at Dartmouth College Library
The Papers of Harold Noice at Dartmouth College Library
 The Papers of Burt McConnell at Dartmouth College Library
 James Crawford Diaries and Photographs at Dartmouth College Library
 The Papers of Storker T. Storkerson at Dartmouth College Library

History of Nunavut
History of the Northwest Territories
Maritime history of Canada
Arctic expeditions
History of the Inuvialuit Settlement Region
1913 in Canada
20th century in the Arctic
Science and technology in Canada
1914 in Canada
1915 in Canada
1916 in Canada
Events of National Historic Significance (Canada)